Kim Nam-joo (born April 15, 1995), better known by the mononym Namjoo, is a South Korean singer and actress. She is best known as a member of the South Korean girl group Apink.

Career

Pre-debut
Before debuting with Apink, she starred in a 2003 LG Electronics commercial at 6, and in 2007 TV commercial at age 13.

2011-present: Apink

Kim joined Cube Entertainment through the 2010 Cube Party auditions and was one of the last Apink members to be introduced before the group's debut. Kim debuted with Apink on Mnet's M! Countdown performing their songs "I Don't Know" (몰라요; Mollayo) and "Wishlist" which were included on their debut EP Seven Springs of Apink on April 21, 2011. She is also one of the two members of Apink's sub-unit PINK BnN along with Yoon Bo-mi.

2015–present: Solo activities
In September 2015, she was cast in Naver TV's 8-episode web series Investigator Alice, where she portrayed detective Chun Yeon-joo. She reprised her role in its second season, in 2016.

In March 2015, Kim joined MBC's Tutoring Across Generations in place of Lee Tae-im, but the show got cancelled on April 2 after episode 21 due to falling ratings. Kim with fellow member Yoon Bo-mi appeared on Sugar Man as PINK BnN on October 20, 2015. In 2016, Kim and Apink co-member Yoon Bo-mi became the new MCs of Shikshin Road 2. In the December 27 broadcast of King of Mask Singer, it was revealed that Kim was behind the mask "Good Daughter Shim Cheong".

Between 2017 and 2018, Kim played the role of detective Oh Jin-Kyung in Naver TV's Bad Boy Detectives, once again collaborating with the team behind Investigator Alice.

In October 2017, Kim was cast in the lead role of Juliet Capulet in Sungkyunkwan University's production of Romeo and Juliet.

On September 7, 2020, Kim made her solo debut with her first single album Bird.

On May 24, 2022, musical producer Shinswave announced that Kim would be making her musical debut with popular stage show, Midnight Sun, as the female lead. To promote the musical, she collaborated with stage member, Onew, to release "A Melody Called You (너라는 멜로디)," as well as the solo song, "Will Such A Day Come? (그런 날이 오게 될까?)."

Other works
Kim alongside groupmate Jung Eun-ji and Jang Hyun-seung, former member of Beast, released the single "A Year Ago" from the project A Cube For Season #White on January 3, 2013, to commemorate the success of their respective groups.

In 2014, she performed "Seoul Lonely" with the hip-hop trio Phantom on several music programs.

On June 2, 2015, she released a duet with BtoB's Yook Sung-jae entitled "Photograph", as part of Cube Entertainment's project single album A Cube For Season #Blue Season 2.

On February 14, 2019, Kim launched her own fashion line, Sugar Please.

Personal life
Kim attended Seoul Performing Arts High School along with fellow Apink members Son Na-eun, Oh Ha-young, and former member Hong Yoo-kyung. She graduated in February 2014. In 2015, Kim was accepted to Sungkyunkwan University's Department of Performance Arts.

Discography

Single albums

Singles

Videography

Music videos

Filmography

Web series

Television shows

Musical theatre

Notes

References

External links

 

Living people
1995 births
21st-century South Korean singers
Apink members
People from Seoul
South Korean female idols
IST Entertainment artists
21st-century South Korean actresses
South Korean women pop singers
School of Performing Arts Seoul alumni
Weekly Idol members
21st-century South Korean women singers